Dober, also called Doberbach, is a river of Thuringia and Bavaria, Germany.

Its source is in the Franconian Forest, south of the Wetzstein and southwest of Brennersgrün, a district of Lehesten. Northwest of Lahm, a district of Wilhelmsthal, the Dober flows into the Kremnitz.

Tributaries of the Dober are the Schwarze Sutte from the right and the Dorfbach (in Tschirn) from the left.

See also
List of rivers of Thuringia
List of rivers of Bavaria

Rivers of Thuringia
Rivers of Bavaria
Rivers of Germany